Al-Qaid Jawhar ibn Abdallah (better known as Jawhar  al Siqilli, al-Qaid al-Siqilli (The Sicilian General); died 28 April 992) was a Shia Muslim Fatimid general from the Byzantine (Eastern Roman) Empire who led the conquest of Maghreb, and subsequently the conquest of Egypt, for the 4th Fatimid Imam-Caliph al-Mu'izz li-Din Allah. He served as viceroy of Egypt until al-Mu'izz's arrival in 973, consolidating Fatimid control over the country and laying the foundations for the city of Cairo. After that, he retired from public life until his death.

He is variously known with the nisbas al-Siqilli, al-Saqlabi, al-Rumi; and with the titles al-Katib and al-Qa'id.

Biography
The birth date of Al-Qaid Jawhar is not known, but as he died in 992, and the peak of his career was between 950 and 975, he cannot have been born earlier than the 900s. His father, Abdallah, was a slave, but Jawhar himself is attested in the sources only as a freedman.

Al-Qaid Jawhar is first mentioned as a page (ghulām) and possibly a secretary, to the third Fatimid caliph, al-Mansur bi-Nasr Allah. In 958, al-Mansur's son and successor, al-Mu'izz li-Din Allah chose Jawhar to lead a campaign to restore Fatimid control over the central and western parts of North Africa. In this campaign, Jawhar first gave proof of his exceptional military talents. He first led the Fatimid armies to victory over the Zenata, a Berber tribe that had allied with the Fatimids' rivals, the Arab Umayyads of the Caliphate of Cordoba, defeating and killing their leader, Ya'la ibn Muhammad al-Yafrani. He then turned southeast towards Sijilmasa, capturing and killing its ruler Muhammad ibn al-Fath ibn Maymun ibn Midrar. It was not until a year later, in October 960, that he moved north towards Fez, taking the city by storm on 13 November and capturing its Umayyad governor, Ahmad ibn Abi Bakr al-Judhami. With this victory, all of the Maghreb, apart from Tangier and Ceuta, came under Fatimid control, or recognized Fatimid suzerainty. As token of his victory, Jawhar is said to have sent jars filled with live fish from the Atlantic Ocean to the Caliph in Ifriqiya.

It is reported that Al-Mu'izz li-Din Allah would spend hours discussing tactics and strategy with Al-Qaid Jawhar in his tent before the campaign of North Africa began, and when they finally parted, Al-Mu`izz granted Al-Qaid Jawhar with very high honors requiring all soldiers disembark their horse as a sign of respect for the commander-in-chief.

Conquest of Egypt

After the Western borders had been secured, Jawhar led the Fatimid invasion of Ikhshidid Egypt (969). He approached Egypt from the direction of Alexandria and marched towards the capital, Fustat. His army encountered little resistance and the country was secured by a treaty with the Ikhshidid vizier Abu Ja'far Muslim. Some divisions of the Ikhshidid army mutinied in protest and took up positions on Roda Island in the Nile, to defend the river crossing and prevent the Fatimid army from gaining access to Fustat. Jawhar stormed the island with his Kutama troops and cleared away the enemy soldiers before proceeding to peacefully enter Fustat.

As Jawhar pacified Egypt the Fatimid army began its invasion of Ikhshidid Syria (970) under the Kutama general Ja'far ibn Falah. After initial successes this army was destroyed near Damscus in August 971 by a coalition of Ikhshidid soldiers and Arab tribesmen led by the Qarmatians of Bahrain. Egypt was left defenceless and was invaded by the coalition in September. Jawhar had no troops at hand so he mobilised the entire population of Fustat to build a defensive line consisting of a wall and a ditch at a bottleneck north of the city. As the coalition army stalled in the Nile Delta Jawhar managed to finish his preparations in time. The invaders' attempt to take Fustat was foiled by the defences and Jawhar routed them in battle outside the city with his raw troops.

Al-Qaid Jawhar died on 28 April 992. He is presumed to be buried in Cairo, Egypt, but his resting place is unknown as of yet.

See also

References

Sources
 
 

992 deaths
People from Sicily
10th-century births
10th-century people from the Fatimid Caliphate
10th-century rulers in Africa
City founders
Generals of the Fatimid Caliphate
10th-century Shia Muslims